The Preobrazhensky Life-Guards Regiment (Preobrazhensky leyb-gvardii polk) was a regiment of the Imperial Guard of the Imperial Russian Army from 1683 to 1917. 

The Preobrazhensky Regiment was one of the oldest elite units in Imperial Russia, along with the Semyonovsky Regiment. It served as a gendarmerie unit for the state Secret Chancellery, the first secret police of Russia headed by Prince Fyodor Romodanovsky. The regiment formed part of the 1st Brigade of the 1st Guards Infantry Division stationed on the Fontanka in Saint Petersburg. It was disbanded shortly before the October Revolution in 1917.

The Preobrazhensky Regiment was recreated in 2013 as the 154th Preobrazhensky Independent Commandant's Regiment, the official honor guard regiment of the Russian Armed Forces, stationed in Moscow.

History
The young Tsar Peter I of Russia (born 1672) developed the regiment from 1683 onwards on the basis of his  poteshnye voiska ("toy forces"), during the military games he conducted in the village of  Preobrazhenskoye (now a district in Moscow). The Preobrazhensky Company of Peter's forces officially formed in 1687; it had expanded to become a regiment by the 1690s.
The Preobrazhensky Regiment distinguished itself during the Great Northern War of 1700–1721, the Patriotic War of 1812, and the  Russo-Turkish War of 1877–1878.

The regiment operated as the body-guard of the Grand Duchess Yekaterina Alekseevna as well as the main supporter of her bloodless 1762 coup against her husband Emperor Peter III; having become Empress  Catherine II she declared the Preobrazhensky highest in the order of military precedence from 14 July 1762.

In spite of its distinguished record, part of one battalion of the regiment mutinied in June 1906, at a time of general unrest in the Russian Empire. The mutiny was quickly suppressed and 190 soldiers sentenced to service in disciplinary battalions.

Colonel Alexander Kutepov (later a general) became the last commander of the regiment in April 1917; he disbanded the formation in December 1917 in the wake of the October Revolution of November 1917. In 2013 the regiment re-formed within the Russian Armed Forces as the 154th Preobrazhensky Independent Commandant's Regiment.

Timeline

 1683 – Peter the Great begins to assemble the droll regiments. Initially the number of soldiers was fewer than fifty.
 1687 – Droll regiments become the Semenovsky regiment and Preobrazhensky regiments of the regular army.
 1695 – Preobrazhensky regiment (nine companies) takes part in the Azov campaigns.
 1696 – The regiment is divided into four battalions and two separate companies of bombardiers and grenadiers.
 1700–1720 - Takes part in all major battles of the Great Northern War.
 1700 – Before the Battle of Narva is officially named Leib-Guard Preobrazhensky regiment.
 1706 – Tsar Peter the Great adopts the military rank of colonel of Preobrazhensky regiment.
 1722 – Takes part in the war against Persia.
 1722 – According to Russian Table of Ranks soldiers of Preobrazhensky regiment were to be considered two ranks higher than in ordinary units.
 1726 – Moscow company of Preobrazhensky regiment becomes a separate Moscow life-guard battalion and later Murom leib-guard battalion.
 1737–1739 – War against Ottoman Empire.
 1737 – Takes part in the Battle of Ochakov.
 1742 – War against Sweden.
 1762 – On 17 July declared first and highest in the military order of precedence in the Imperial Russian Army and the Imperial Russian Guard.
 1789–1790 - War against Sweden.
 1796 – Battalions of the Preobrazhensky regiment are named according to their chiefs: 1st battalion - His Majesty, 2nd battalion - Lieutenant-General Tatischev, 3d Battalion - General Field-Marshal Suvorov, Grenadier Battalion - Major-General Arakcheev.
 1805 – As a part of the Grand Duke's Corps of Guards the 1st and 3rd battalions leave St. Petersburg for Austria on 22 August; on 2 December take part in the battle of Austerlitz and return to St. Petersburg on 19 April 1806.
 1807 – In February the Regiment, consisting of all 4 battalions, starts the march as a part of Grand Duke's Corps of Guards; on 5 June engages Ney’s troops near Guttstadt and Altkirchen and on 14 June takes part in the battle of Friedland; returns to St. Petersburg in August.
 1808 – On 9 September the 2nd battalion of the regiment enters the Corps of Major-General Strogonov in Vilmanstrand (Finland).
 1809 – On 10 March, being a part of the Corps of Lieutenant-General Prince Bagration, starts its march to Sweden through the Aland islands; on 14 March fights the enemy's rearguard on the island of Lemland; on 17 March stops on the Eckerö island, closest to the Swedish shore, and after the talks with Sweden begins moving back; returns to St. Petersburg in October.

 1811 – The regiment is transformed into 3 battalions; each battalion now comprises one grenadier company (grenadier and tirailleur platoons) and three fusilier companies.
 1812 – As a part of the Grand Duke's Corps of Guards, the regiment moves in March to Vilno, where it joins the 1st Western Army of Barclay-de-Tolly; on 7 September takes part in the battle of Borodino. During the French retreat from Moscow the regiment was in the reserve all the time and returns to Vilno in December.
 1813 – On 13 January, the Guard crosses the Nieman river in the presence of the Emperor; on 2 April participates in the grand parade in the presence of the Emperor and King Frederick William III of Prussia; on 14 April triumphantly enters Dresden; on 2 May takes part in the battle of Lutzen; on the 19th, 20th and 21 May the regiment is a central reserve under the command of Grand Duke in the battle of Bautzen; on 28 August and 29 August, being a part of 1st Guards Infantry Division under the command of General Yermolov, is distinguished in the Battle of Kulm.
 1814 – On 13 January in the presence of the Emperor Alexander I, the Regiment crosses the Rhine at Basel and as a part of the reserve of the Main Army under Barklay-de-Tolly, participates in every offensive and retreat until the battle of Paris (30 March); on 31 March triumphantly enters the capital of France; 1st battalion of the regiment has its bivouac near the Palace of Tuileries. After staying in Paris for more than two months the Regiment leaves for Normandy, embarking at Cherbourg on 15 June and on 12 August entering St. Petersburg through the Triumphal arch, constructed by the Emperor's order in the memory of excellent service of the Guard in 1812—1814.
 1877–1878 - War against Ottoman Empire.
 1906 – First Battalion excluded from the regiment and stripped of Life-Guard privileges, instead the new first battalion of the regiment is formed from cavaliers of the Order of St. George and heroes of the Russo-Japanese War.
 1914–1917 - Participated in World War I.
 1917 – Garrison battalions participated in the February Revolution mutining on Monday 12 March; leading to the abdication of Tsar Nicholas II. Disbanded in December by Alexander Kutepov, its last commander.
 2013 – Re-established as the 154th Preobrazhensky Independent Commandant's Regiment.

Basis of recruitment
In the 18th and 19th centuries, officers of the Preobrazhensky Regiment were young Russian aristocrats and appointment was considered a proof of loyalty to the government and the tsar. Among its membership was the Russian composer Modest Mussorgsky.

After 1874 ordinary soldiers of the Preobrazhensky Regiment were mainly conscripts undertaking their obligation to serve for three years in the active army and fifteen years in the reserve (Opolchaniya). For the Preobrazhensky Regiment conscripts were selected for their height and fair hair (in order to provide a standardised appearance on parade).

Flag
The regimental flag was of St. George's colours, with the inscription: "For displayed feats in battle of Kulm 17th of August 1813". (29 August 1813 in the Julian calendar).

This colour was given to the regiment in order to celebrate its action at Kulm, where the outnumbered Preobrazhensky regiment withstood the charge of French troops.

Uniforms

Throughout its history the regiment wore the standard uniform of the Infantry of the Imperial Guard, which from 1683 to 1914 was predominantly of a dark green (eventually verging on black) colour. The main distinctions of the Preobrazhensky Regiment were the red facings (plastron, collar, cuffs and shoulder straps) edged in white piping. Distinctive regimental patterns of braid (litzen) were worn on the tunic collar, plus the tsar's monogram on the soldiers' shoulder straps and officers' epaulettes. 

Following the Russo-Turkish War, the regiment was awarded a small bronze scroll to be worn as a battle-honour on shakos and other headdresses. In 1883, in recognition of its overall distinguished record, officers of the regiment were authorised to wear a large metal gorget inscribed "1683-1850-1883". A second model of gorget, designed in imitation of that worn during the 18th century was approved for the regiment in 1910.

During World War I the Preobrazhensky Regiment retained the distinction of white edgings on the khaki-grey field uniforms adopted in 1909 (see illustration of commanding officer and senior ncos opposite).

Sailors of the Preobrazhensky
An unusual feature of the Preobrazhensky Regiment was that it included a small detachment of sailors. Intended to commemorate a period during the reign of Peter the Great when the regiment served on board ship as temporary marines, this unit provided rowers for members of the Imperial Family when embarked on ceremonial barges on the Neva. The Preobrazhensky sailors wore naval dress, distinguished by orange stripes on the neck-collar.

Preobrazhensky March

The "Preobrazhensky Regiment March" is one of the most famous Russian military marches. It was used as an unofficial national anthem in imperial times. The march has been often used in modern Russia, particularly in the annual Victory Day Parade for the trooping the colours and the inspection of troops.

Before World War I it was used as the presentation march in several military formations in Prussia   Since 1964 it has been used as the slow march of the Royal Marines.

Several lyrics are known for the march.

Notable people who served in the Preobrazhensky Regiment
 Abram Petrovich Gannibal (1696–1781)
 Gavrila Derzhavin (1743–1816)
 Modest Mussorgsky (1839–1881)
 Alexander Kutepov (1882–1930)

See also
 154th Preobrazhensky Independent Commandant's Regiment
 Russian Imperial Guard

References

External links

 History of Preobrazhensky regiment - in Russian
 Preobrazhensky March - Regimental anthem

Infantry regiments of the Russian Empire
Russian military units and formations of the Napoleonic Wars
Russian Imperial Guard
Former guards regiments
Military units and formations established in 1687
17th-century establishments in Russia
Saint Petersburg Governorate
1687 establishments in Russia
Guards regiments of the Russian Empire